Cedar Rapids Transit, stylized as CR Transit, is the primary provider of mass transportation in Cedar Rapids, Iowa. Prior to 2008, the Cedar Rapids public transportation system was known as Environmental Alternative for a Greater Lifestyle (EAGL) from 1993 to 2008, and Easyrider prior to 1993. Twelve routes serve the city, with most radiating from the Ground Transportation Center in downtown Cedar Rapids, as well as two circulator routes. In addition to providing transit service, Cedar Rapids Transit also provides ADA Paratransit service to passengers with qualifying disabilities. The system runs Monday through Saturday. There is no service on Sundays, New Year's Day, Memorial Day, Independence Day, Labor Day, Thanksgiving Day, and Christmas Day.

Routes 
Cedar Rapids Transit operates 12 routes, 10 of which originate in downtown Cedar Rapids at the Ground Transportation Center. Additionally, there are two circulator routes that serve Marion and north Cedar Rapids/Hiawatha.

Route list

Bus tracking 
Bus tracking for Cedar Rapids Transit is available through Ride Systems, which shows all buses on a map with real-time location. The location of each bus  is represented as an icon along with the bus number, and is color coded for different routes. Individual routes can also be selected to show the route path and stop locations.

Fleet

See also
List of intercity bus stops in Iowa

References

External links 
 Cedar Rapids Transit

Transportation in Cedar Rapids, Iowa
Bus transportation in Iowa
Transportation in Linn County, Iowa